Sterling is a home rule municipality and the county seat and most populous municipality of Logan County, Colorado, United States. Sterling is the principal city of the Sterling, CO Micropolitan Statistical Area. The city population was 13,753 at the 2020 census.

Sterling is the largest city on the Colorado plains outside of the Front Range Urban Corridor and the county seat of Logan County and the site of the domed Logan County courthouse, built in 1909.

History
A post office called Sterling has been in operation since 1874. The community was named for Sterling, Illinois, the native home of a railroad official.

Geography

Climate
According to the Köppen Climate Classification system, Sterling has a semi-arid climate, abbreviated "BSk" on climate maps.
<div style="width:65%">

</div styl>

Demographics

As of the 2020 census, there were 13,753 people, 4,604 households, and 2,790 families living in the city. The racial makeup of the city was 90.75% Caucasian American, 0.75% African American, 0.79% Native American, 0.41% Asian, 0.08% Pacific Islander, 5.60% from other races, and 1.62% from two or more races. Hispanic or Latino of any race were 14.20% of the population.

There were 4,604 households, out of which 30.6% had children under the age of 18 living with them, 46.2% were married couples living together, 10.8% had a female householder with no husband present, and 39.4% were non-families. 34.1% of all households were made up of individuals, and 14.7% had someone living alone who was 65 years of age or older. The average household size was 2.34 and the average family size was 3.03.

In the city, the population was spread out, with 25.5% under the age of 18, 12.9% from 18 to 24, 25.5% from 25 to 44, 19.6% from 45 to 64, and 16.4% who were 65 years of age or older. The median age was 35 years. For every 100 females, there were 94.7 males. For every 100 females age 18 and over, there were 91.2 males.

The median income for a household in the city was $27,337, and the median income for a family was $39,103. Males had a median income of $27,921 versus $20,508 for females. The per capita income for the city was $15,287.

Economy

Major employers in Sterling include Northeastern Junior College, the RE-1 Valley School system, and the Sterling Correctional Facility.

Sterling is the major shopping hub for most of northeastern Colorado and hosts stores like Wal-Mart, The Home Depot, Maurices, and The Buckle, as well as many local retailers located primarily on Main Street. Six different banks have branches in Sterling and there are local AM and FM radio stations as well as a local television station, and a long established regional newspaper, the Sterling Journal-Advocate and South Platte Sentinel .

Government
The Colorado Department of Corrections operates the Sterling Correctional Facility in Sterling.

Education
Sterling is the home of Northeastern Junior College, a residential two year college in Colorado.

Sterling is also the location of the RE-1 Valley School District.

Infrastructure

Transportation
Crosson Field Municipal Airport serves Sterling, but there are no scheduled flights available from there.

Sterling is also served by railroads, although only freight carriers serve the town. The main rail operator is Burlington Northern Santa Fe (BNSF), but other operators, like Union Pacific, serve Sterling as well.

Scheduled bus service is offered by Black Hills Stage Lines with service to Ft. Morgan and Denver in Colorado, as well as number of cities in Nebraska including North Platte, Kearney, and Omaha.

Highways
 Interstate 76 connects Sterling to Denver ( southwest) and northeast to Interstate 80, in Big Springs, Nebraska, along the South Platte River.
 Business Loop 76 starts on the intersection of Interstate 76 and US 6, going through East Chestnut Street, North and South 4th Street, South Division Avenue, returning to US 6, connecting Sterling to Atwood and Merino.
 US 6 runs east–west linking Provincetown, Massachusetts with Bishop, California, via Nevada, Colorado, Illinois and 8 other states.
 US 138 Runs parallel to Interstate 76, connecting Sterling to US 30, north of Big Springs, Nebraska.

Health care
Sterling is a regional center for health care as well, and is the home of the Sterling Regional Medical Center.

Media

Radio
 KSRX (97.5 FM), Branded as Bob FM, plays "80's, 90's... and whatever!"

See also

Outline of Colorado
Index of Colorado-related articles
State of Colorado
Colorado cities and towns
Colorado municipalities
Colorado counties
Logan County, Colorado
List of statistical areas in Colorado
Sterling, CO Micropolitan Statistical Area

References

External links
City of Sterling website

 
Cities in Logan County, Colorado
Cities in Colorado
County seats in Colorado
Eastern Plains
1868 establishments in Colorado Territory